Burdenis Glacier is the 6 km long and 1.7 km wide glacier on the east side of the main crest of north-central Sentinel Range in Ellsworth Mountains, Antarctica.  It is situated north of Delyo Glacier and south of Gerila Glacier.  The glacier drains the north slopes of Mount Viets and the southeast slopes of the southern summit of Long Gables Peak, flows northeastwards and together with Delyo Glacier and Gerila Glacier joins upper Ellen Glacier north of Bruguière Peak.

The glacier is named after the ancient Roman settlement of Burdenis in Southern Bulgaria.

Location
US mapping in 1961 and 1988.

See also
 List of glaciers in the Antarctic
 Glaciology

Maps
 Vinson Massif.  Scale 1:250 000 topographic map.  Reston, Virginia: US Geological Survey, 1988.
 Antarctic Digital Database (ADD). Scale 1:250000 topographic map of Antarctica. Scientific Committee on Antarctic Research (SCAR). Since 1993, regularly upgraded and updated.

References
 Burdenis Glacier. SCAR Composite Gazetteer of Antarctica.
 Bulgarian Antarctic Gazetteer. Antarctic Place-names Commission. (details in Bulgarian, basic data in English)

External links
 Burdenis Glacier. Copernix satellite image

 

Glaciers of Ellsworth Land
Bulgaria and the Antarctic